The Washington Nationals farm system consists of six Minor League Baseball affiliates across the United States and in the Dominican Republic. Four teams are independently owned, while the Florida Complex League Nationals and the Dominican Summer League Nationals are owned by the major league club.

From 1969 to 2004, the Nationals franchise played as the Montreal Expos. The Expos-Nationals franchise has been affiliated with the Double-A Harrisburg Senators of the Eastern League since 1991, making it the longest-running active affiliation in the organization among teams not owned by the Nationals. The longest continuous affiliation in Montreal-Washington franchise history was the 29-year relationship with the Class A-Advanced Florida State League's West Palm Beach Expos from 1969 to 1997.

Washington Nationals

2021–present
The current structure of Minor League Baseball is the result of an overall contraction of the system beginning with the 2021 season. Class A was reduced to two levels: High-A and Low-A. Class A Short Season teams and domestic Rookie League teams that operated away from spring training facilities were eliminated. Low-A was reclassified as Single-A in 2022.

2005–2020
Minor League Baseball operated with six classes from 1990 to 2020. The Class A level was subdivided for a second time with the creation of Class A-Advanced. The Rookie level consisted of domestic and foreign circuits.

Montreal Expos

1990–2004

1969–1989

References

External links
 Major League Baseball Prospect News: Washington Nationals
 Baseball-Reference: Washington Nationals League Affiliations

Minor league